Crawley is a town in West Sussex, England.

Crawley may also refer to:

Places
In Australia:
Crawley, Western Australia
In England:
Crawley (ward), Luton, Bedfordshire
Crawley, Hampshire
Crawley, Oxfordshire
North Crawley, Milton Keynes, Buckinghamshire
Crawley Down, West Sussex
In the United States:
Crawley, West Virginia

Other uses 
 Crawley (surname)
 Crawley (UK Parliament constituency)
 Crawley Town F.C., football club
 The Crawley family, a fictitious aristocratic family in the British TV period drama Downton Abbey

See also
Crowley (disambiguation)